Point Foundation is a scholarship fund that provides financial aid for lesbian, gay, bisexual, transgender, and queer (LGBTQ+) college bound students in the United States. Founded in 2001, the overall mission of this organization to give these individuals the opportunity to receive the resources that they need to become pillars in society. It is one of only a few scholarship organizations that is solely for LGBTQ+ students.

Mission Statement 
The foundation's mission statement is: "Point Foundation empowers promising lesbian, gay, bisexual, transgender, and queer students to achieve their full academic and leadership potential – despite the obstacles often put before them – to make a significant impact on society."

Community College Scholarship and Support Program 
In 2016, Point initiated a new Community College Scholarship Program, a one-year transformative experience offering academic and personal development for community college students as they plan to transfer to a four-year institution. Wells Fargo funded the inaugural year of the program which assisted 11 students. Point has since expanded the Community College Scholarship Program, accepting approximately 25 students each year. Students accepted into the program will receive up to a $3,700 tuition scholarship, admissions counseling, coaching, and financial education at the Point Community College Transfer Symposium in Los Angeles.

See also
List of LGBT-related organizations
Campus Pride
Pride Foundation
Education and the LGBT community

References

External links
 Point Foundation
 Youtube video "What is Point Foundation?"

Organizations based in Los Angeles
Organizations established in 2001
2001 establishments in California
Educational foundations in the United States
LGBT and education
LGBT youth organizations based in the United States
Scholarships in the United States
LGBT culture in Los Angeles